Scott Russell (born January 16, 1979, in Windsor, Ontario) is a former Canadian javelin thrower.

He finished first at the 1998 World Junior Championships, tenth at the 2001 Summer Universiade, won a silver medal at the 2002 Commonwealth Games, finished twelfth at the 2005 World Championships, eighth at the 2006 Commonwealth Games and tenth at the 2008 Olympic Games. He also competed at the World Championships in 2001 and 2007 without reaching the final round.

Russell holds the Canadian record for javelin throw, with a throw of 84.81 metres on July 13, 2011, at the Toronto International Track and Field Games. When he is not in the Olympics, he teaches Health and Physical Education for Basehor-Linwood middle school in Kansas. He also coached for Lawrence High J-Squad in 2008–2009.

Achievements

Seasonal bests by year
1998 - 75.46
1999 - 76.80
2000 - 78.94
2001 - 81.66
2002 - 79.85
2003 - 81.56
2004 - 77.87
2005 - 84.41
2006 - 79.55
2007 - 83.98
2008 - 83.20
2009 - 75.08
2011 - 84.81
2012 - 80.60

See also
 Canadian records in track and field

References

External links
 
 
 
 
 
 

1979 births
Living people
Athletes (track and field) at the 2002 Commonwealth Games
Athletes (track and field) at the 2006 Commonwealth Games
Athletes (track and field) at the 2008 Summer Olympics
Canadian male javelin throwers
Commonwealth Games silver medallists for Canada
Olympic track and field athletes of Canada
Sportspeople from Windsor, Ontario
Track and field athletes from Ontario
Commonwealth Games medallists in athletics
World Athletics Championships athletes for Canada
Competitors at the 2001 Summer Universiade
20th-century Canadian people
21st-century Canadian people
Medallists at the 2002 Commonwealth Games